Pope Clement I (Saint Clement, died 99AD) is called San Clemente in Spanish and Italian and gives his name to many places.

San Clemente may refer to:

Argentina
San Clemente del Tuyú, a town in the Partido de la Costa district of the Province of Buenos Aires

Chile
San Clemente, Chile, a city and commune administered by the municipality of San Clemente, located in the Talca Province, in the Maule Region

Ecuador
San Clemente, Ecuador, a coastal village located in the province of Manabí

Italy
San Clemente, Emilia-Romagna, a comune in the province of Rimini, in the region Emilia-Romagna
Basilica di San Clemente, a Roman Catholic minor basilica dedicated to Pope Clement I located in Rome
Isola di San Clemente, a small island in the Venetian Lagoon
San Clemente, Padua, the Piazza dei Signori in Padua
Palazzo di San Clemente, a residential palace in Florence
San Clemente, Brescia, an ancient church located in central Brescia, near the Piazza del Foro, Italy
Abbey of San Clemente a Casauria, an abbey in Castiglione a Casauria, in the province of Pescara, Abruzzo, central Italy
Abbey of San Clemente al Volmano, in the province of Teramo, Abruzzo

Peru
San Clemente District, one of eight districts of the province Pisco

Philippines
San Clemente, Tarlac, a fifth class municipality in the province of Tarlac

Spain
San Clemente, Cuenca, a municipality in the province of Cuenca, in the autonomous community of Castile-La Mancha
Cuevas de San Clemente, a municipality in the province of Burgos, in the autonomous community of Castile and León
San Clemente (Ibias), one of eleven parishes (administrative divisions) in the municipality of Ibias, within the province and autonomous community of Asturias
San Clemente Dormitory, a public dormitory, depending on the University of Santiago de Compostela, located in the city of Santiago de Compostela, Galicia, Spain
San Clemente Reservoir, a reservoir in Huéscar, province of Granada, Andalusia, Spain

United States
San Clemente, California
San Clemente State Beach
San Clemente Island, California
San Clemente Island Air Force Station
San Clemente Canyon, San Diego, California
San Clemente Dam, Monterey County, California
San Clemente station, Los Angeles, California

Other uses
San Clemente Handicap, an American horse race 
San Clemente loggerhead shrike, a bird subspecies endemic to San Clemente Island, California

See also
San Clemente High School (disambiguation)
Saint Clement (disambiguation)